Echinicola jeungdonensis  is a non-motile bacterium from the genus of Echinicola which has been isolated from a solar saltern in Jeungdo in Korea.

References 

Cytophagia
Bacteria described in 2011